The Slovenia national football team represents Slovenia in men's international football and is controlled by the Football Association of Slovenia, the governing body for football in Slovenia. The squad is under the global jurisdiction of FIFA and is governed in Europe by UEFA. It competes in the three major professional tournaments available to European nations: the FIFA World Cup, UEFA Nations League and the UEFA European Championship. Slovenia played its first official match in 1992, one year after the country gained independence from Yugoslavia. The majority of Slovenia's home matches are played at Stožice Stadium in Ljubljana. 

Slovenia have qualified for the FIFA World Cup on two occasions, and the UEFA European Championship once, but have never progressed beyond the group stage of a finals tournament. At the 2010 FIFA World Cup, Slovenia achieved its first (and so far only) victory in a major tournament, defeating Algeria 1–0. The team have achieved some noteworthy results, such as beating the 2006 FIFA World Cup winners Italy 1–0 in 2004, which was Italy's only defeat in the entire 2006 World Cup campaign. Their biggest defeat came in 2002 with a 5–0 loss to France, while their highest-scoring victory was a 7–0 win over Oman in 1999. 

Boštjan Cesar holds the record for Slovenia appearances, having played 101 times between 2003 and 2018. Zlatko Zahovič scored 35 goals for Slovenia and is the record holder for most goals scored.

History

Origins and pre-independence years (1921–1991)
Before Slovenia's independence in 1991, the national football team of Slovenia existed only as a regional team, not officially recognised by FIFA. On 23 June 1921, the Slovenian capital Ljubljana hosted a match between France and a selection of players from Slovenian clubs. One of the guests at the match was the acting FIFA president Jules Rimet, who later initiated the first FIFA World Cup tournament. The French team won the match 5–0 and, although the match was not official by international standards, it was, at least in Slovenia, generally accepted as the first appearance of the Slovenian national team. In the following decades, Slovenia played four more unofficial friendly matches: in 1956 against China, in 1968 against Austria, in 1990 against Bosnia and Herzegovina, and in 1991 against Croatia.

Independence, first victory and first qualifiers (1992–1998)
In 1992, one year after Slovenia's independence from Yugoslavia, the national team was admitted to UEFA and FIFA. On 3 June of the same year, Slovenia played its first FIFA-recognised game, a friendly match against Estonia in Tallinn. The match ended in a 1–1 draw, and the first official goal for the team was scored by Igor Benedejčič. The first team manager was Bojan Prašnikar. On 7 April 1993, the two teams played another friendly, and this time Slovenia achieved its first international victory by winning the match 2–0.

In 1994, managed by Zdenko Verdenik, Slovenia debuted in official competitions as the team competed in the UEFA Euro 1996 qualifiers. Slovenia played in Group 4 and finished in fifth place out of six teams, with eleven points. In the opening match of the qualifiers, Slovenia drew 1–1 at home against the 1994 FIFA World Cup finalists Italy. In the qualifiers for the 1998 FIFA World Cup, in a group with Denmark, Croatia, Greece and Bosnia and Herzegovina, Slovenia finished in last place, registering just one point in eight matches.

Golden generation (1998–2002)

UEFA Euro 2000 campaign
In July 1998, Srečko Katanec was appointed as the new manager of the team. Under his guidance, Slovenia finished the UEFA Euro 2000 qualifiers in second place, only behind Norway. Zlatko Zahovič scored eight of Slovenia's twelve goals in the qualifiers. In the additional playoffs, Slovenia faced Ukraine. The first leg was played in Ljubljana, which Slovenia won 2–1 after going a goal behind. Zahovič scored Slovenia's first goal, and Milenko Ačimovič scored a goal from the halfway line late in the match for the final score of 2–1. The second match was played in snowy conditions in Kyiv. Serhii Rebrov scored from the penalty spot in the 68th minute to give Ukraine a lead, while Slovenia equalised eight minutes later with a goal by Miran Pavlin. The 1–1 draw meant that Slovenia won 3–2 on aggregate and qualified for its first major tournament.

At UEFA Euro 2000, Slovenia were drawn into Group C, together with Spain, FR Yugoslavia and Norway. In the first game, Slovenia played against Yugoslavia and took a 3–0 lead after one hour of play, with Zahovič scoring twice and Pavlin once. However, Yugoslavia made a comeback as they scored three goals in just six minutes for a final score of 3–3, playing with only ten players after Siniša Mihajlović was sent off when the score was still 3–0 for Slovenia. The second game against Spain was played in Amsterdam. Spain took a 1–0 lead with a goal by Raúl, but Slovenia equalised after one hour of play as Zahovič scored his third goal of the tournament. Just a minute later, Spain was leading again as Joseba Etxeberria scored the winning goal. In the last round of the group stage, Slovenia played against Norway and still had a chance to progress to the quarterfinals. The match finished in a goalless draw and Slovenia won its second point of the tournament, but was eliminated.

2002 FIFA World Cup campaign
For the 2002 FIFA World Cup qualifiers, Slovenia were drawn into a group with Russia, FR Yugoslavia, Switzerland, Faroe Islands and Luxembourg. In its first five qualifying games, Slovenia won only one match (away at Luxembourg), and even drew 2–2 with the underdogs Faroe Islands despite leading 2–0 with less than five minutes remaining. In the next five matches, Slovenia won four times, including a last minute victory over Russia. Slovenia finished in second place without a single defeat, and advanced to the playoff stage. In the playoffs, Slovenia faced Romania. They came from a goal down to win the first game 2–1 with the goals from Ačimovič in the first half and Milan Osterc in the second half. In the second leg in Bucharest, Slovenia took the lead with a goal scored by Mladen Rudonja. The final result was 1–1, and Slovenia qualified for its second consecutive major tournament and first ever World Cup.

At the World Cup, Slovenia played in Group B with Spain, Paraguay and South Africa. In the first game, Slovenia faced Spain for the second time in a row at a big tournament, having lost the previous game at Euro 2000. Spain took the lead in the first half with the goal from Raúl. Juan Carlos Valerón scored Spain's second goal 15 minutes before full-time for a 2–0 lead. A few minutes later, Sebastjan Cimirotič scored the first World Cup goal for Slovenia to reduce the score to 2–1, before Fernando Hierro scored in the 87th minute for the final score of 3–1. The match is notable due to the conflict between manager Katanec and star player Zahovič, after which Katanec announced his retirement after the tournament, while Zahovič was expelled from the team and sent home. Slovenia lost the two remaining matches against South Africa (1–0) and Paraguay (3–1) and finished last in the group with three defeats.

Decline (2003–2007)
After the resignation of Katanec, Prašnikar took over the team on a four-year contract. The team has undergone some major changes, with several key players retiring from the national team.

In the UEFA Euro 2004 qualifying campaign, Slovenia played against France, Israel, Cyprus and Malta. The team finished in second place with four wins out of eight games, however, they lost both matches against France without scoring any goals. In the playoffs, Slovenia played against its biggest rivals, Croatia. The first leg was played in Zagreb, where Croatia took the lead as Dado Pršo scored a goal in the fifth minute, while Slovenia equalised in the 22nd minute with a goal by Ermin Šiljak, for the final score of 1–1. In the second leg, Pršo scored the only goal of the game 15 minutes into the second half. Croatia qualified for the UEFA Euro 2004 with the aggregate score of 2–1, and Slovenia failed to qualify for its third consecutive major tournament. Šiljak scored a total of nine goals in the whole campaign, thus becoming the top goalscorer of the whole UEFA qualification tournament.

In May 2004, Prašnikar was replaced by Branko Oblak. Under Oblak's management, Slovenia played in the 2006 FIFA World Cup qualifiers. Grouped with Italy, Norway, Scotland, Belarus and Moldova, the team started with victories over Moldova and Italy and a draw against Scotland, but still finished in fourth place after securing only five points in the remaining seven matches. With the victory over Italy, Slovenia became the only team to beat the eventual world champions, as Italy did not lose another game during the entire campaign (qualifiers and the main tournament).

Oblak was still in charge of Slovenia when the UEFA Euro 2008 qualifiers started. Grouped with the Netherlands, Romania, Bulgaria, Belarus, Albania and Luxembourg, the team started out with defeats to Bulgaria and Belarus, thus significantly reducing their chances to qualify, and as a result, in November 2006, Oblak was dismissed by the Football Association of Slovenia. During his two-year stint as the manager, Oblak tried out over forty different players.

In January 2007, Matjaž Kek was appointed as the new manager of the national team. He led Slovenia in the remainder of the Euro 2008 qualifiers, where Slovenia finished in sixth place, only above Luxembourg.

First World Cup victory (2008–2011)

For the 2010 FIFA World Cup qualifiers, Slovenia were drawn into a group with the Czech Republic, Poland, Northern Ireland, Slovakia and San Marino. In its opening match, Slovenia held Poland to a 1–1 draw in Wrocław, before winning two consecutive home games against Slovakia and Northern Ireland, respectively. Slovenia then won only one point in the two games against the Czech Republic and lost away to Northern Ireland, and thus fell to fifth place in the group. However, the team greatly improved its form and won the last four games without conceding a single goal. As runners-up, Slovenia qualified for the playoffs, where they were drawn against Russia. The first leg was played in Moscow. The match ended in a 2–1 win for the home side, with Nejc Pečnik scoring a crucial away goal for Slovenia late in the game. In the second leg, held in Maribor, Slovenia defeated Russia 1–0 with a goal by Zlatko Dedić, advancing to the main tournament with an aggregate score of 2–2 due to the away goals rule. The top scorer of the national team during the qualifying campaign was Milivoje Novaković with five goals.

At the 2010 FIFA World Cup, Slovenia played in Group C alongside England, Algeria and the United States. In the opening game against Algeria, Slovenia achieved its first ever victory at the World Cup after Robert Koren scored the only goal in the match for a 1–0 victory. In their second game against the United States, Slovenia were leading 2–0 at half-time with goals from Valter Birsa and Zlatan Ljubijankić, however, Landon Donovan and Michael Bradley scored in the second half for the United States for the final score of 2–2. In their last match of the group stage, Slovenia lost to England 1–0 with a goal by Jermain Defoe. The United States defeated Algeria with a goal scored in the last moments of the match, thus eliminating Slovenia from the tournament.

After the 2010 World Cup, Slovenia achieved their highest ever position in the FIFA World Rankings, as the team was ranked 15th in October 2010. However, Slovenia started the UEFA Euro 2012 qualifiers with an unexpected home defeat against Northern Ireland. Two defeats against Italy and another unexpected home defeat, this time against Estonia, meant that Slovenia finished only in fourth place in the group, behind Italy, Estonia and Serbia.

Katanec's second spell and management changes (2011–2018)
In October 2011, the Football Association of Slovenia appointed Slaviša Stojanović as the new manager. He led the team in only nine matches, including the first four matches of the 2014 FIFA World Cup qualifiers, where Slovenia recorded one victory and three defeats. He was sacked by the end of 2012 and was replaced by Katanec, who had previously led the team between 1998 and 2002. Under his leadership, Slovenia lost at home to Iceland, before winning four consecutive games to finish third in the group, two points behind Iceland. In the qualifiers for UEFA Euro 2016, Slovenia came close to directly qualifying for the tournament for the first time, however, the team lost a decisive game away to Switzerland. Slovenia led 2–0 with less than 15 minutes remaining, but the Swiss team then scored three times to win 3–2. As the third-placed team, Slovenia advanced to the playoffs, where they were eliminated by the Ukraine 3–1 on aggregate. The qualifiers for the 2018 FIFA World Cup were similar to the previous ones, as Slovenia narrowly lost two decisive away matches against Slovakia and England. After the defeat at Wembley, where Harry Kane scored the only goal of the match in the 94th minute, Katanec announced his resignation as the manager. In December 2017, Tomaž Kavčič became the new manager.

In 2018, Slovenia competed in the inaugural edition of the UEFA Nations League. In accordance with the FIFA World Rankings, the team competed in the third-tier League C along with Bulgaria, Cyprus and Norway. After the poor run of results, in which Slovenia obtained only one point in the first four matches, Kavčič was sacked. He became the manager with the shortest tenure in Slovenian history, leading the team in only seven games. As Slovenia finished last in the group, they were supposed to be relegated to the bottom tier League D, but UEFA changed the system for the next edition and the team remained in League C.

Kek's second spell and Nations League promotion (2019 to present)
Kek was appointed as the manager for the second time in November 2018. Slovenia failed to make a breakthrough during the UEFA Euro 2020 qualifiers, losing both games against Austria and obtaining only one point against North Macedonia. Despite the unexpected 2–0 home victory against Poland, Slovenia finished fourth in the group. In the 2020–21 UEFA Nations League C, however, Slovenia remained undefeated in all six games against Greece, Moldova and Kosovo. Under the leadership of team captain Jan Oblak, Slovenia held Greece to a 0–0 draw in both matches, and also obtained all twelve available points against Moldova and Kosovo, thus securing first place in the group and promotion to League B for the 2022–23 edition. In the 2022 FIFA World Cup qualifiers, Slovenia once again failed to qualify for the main event. They started the campaign with a 1–0 home victory versus Croatia with a goal by Sandi Lovrić, which was notably Slovenia's first victory over their neighbour rivals after failing to beat them in the previous eight official matches. After two narrow defeats against Russia and a surprising defeat to Cyprus, Slovenia finished fourth in the group with four wins in ten matches, behind Croatia, Russia and Slovakia.

In 2022, Slovenia made their maiden appearance in League B of the Nations League, and avoided relegation after finishing third in a group with Serbia, Norway and Sweden. Benjamin Šeško scored three of Slovenia's six goals in the competition, including a goal in the decisive 1–1 away draw to Sweden that secured a crucial point on the last matchday.

Team image

Nickname and mascot
The Slovenian national team does not have an official nickname and was the only team at the 2010 FIFA World Cup without one. During the 2010 World Cup qualifiers, Slovenian journalists and the Football Association of Slovenia tried to choose a nickname for the team, but the process failed to gain the support of fans. In 2010, the Slovenian web portal Siol organized a fan vote and the nickname "Kekci", a reference to the Slovenian fictional child character Kekec and the then national team manager Matjaž Kek, finished in first place. However, the nickname was never officially adopted by the Football Association of Slovenia. "Kekci" is still occasionally used by the Slovenian media when referring to the national team.

During the 2010 World Cup, some foreign media articles used the nickname "Zmajčeki" when referring to the Slovenian national team, however, this was the old nickname of Slovenian club NK Olimpija Ljubljana when they competed in the Yugoslav football system. Because Olimpija had a long tradition in the former Yugoslav First League, football fans and the media in the countries of the former Yugoslavia still use this nickname today when referring to the Slovenian team. The 1998–2002 generation, managed by Srečko Katanec, is still referred to as the 'golden generation'.

In 2002, Slovenia received an official mascot for its appearance at the 2002 FIFA World Cup. The mascot, called Trigi, is based on a round shape representing the Earth or a ball, with a stylized depiction of Triglav, the highest Slovenian mountain, on its head in a green, white and blue colour combination.

Kits and colours

Until 1993, Slovenia played its matches in white, blue and red, which are the traditional colours of the country. In 1993, the board of the Football Association of Slovenia decided to change the main colours to green and white, which were also the main colours of Olimpija from the capital city of Ljubljana.

In December 2009, the board voted to change the kit's colours to white for home matches and blue for away matches. The new colours came into effect in April 2012, when a new all-white home kit with a blue and green trim was unveiled. The new away kit, introduced a couple of months earlier, was all-blue with a white and green trim. In 2016, the all-green version returned as an away kit, while the light blue kit became the new home kit. In 2022, the new Slovenian kits were selected through an online fan vote for the first time. The home colours were again changed to all-white and the away colours to all-blue.

For their World Cup appearances in 2002 and 2010, the Slovenian kit featured a stylized depiction of Triglav. Since 2010, the depiction has been used on each new kit set.

Kit suppliers
Nike has been the team's kit provider since 2007. Previously, the kit providers were Puma, Adidas, Uhlsport, and Kappa.

Home stadium
Slovenia's home matches have been held at ten venues in eight cities. Since 2010, most matches have been played in Ljubljana at the Stožice Stadium, with a seating capacity of 16,038. The final training sessions and physical preparation of the team before domestic matches are held at the National Football Centre Brdo in Predoslje.

The first home stadium of Slovenia was the Bežigrad Stadium, located in the Bežigrad District in Ljubljana. It was the main stadium of the national team until 2004, when UEFA banned it due to insufficient infrastructure. In the same year, the newly built Arena Petrol in Celje became the new main venue of the team for the next three years. For the 2010 World Cup qualifiers, Slovenia moved to the recently renovated Ljudski vrt stadium in Maribor, where the team remained undefeated in their six home matches during the qualifying campaign (five wins and a draw), consequently qualifying for the main tournament. Stožice were built in 2010, and since then the venue has hosted most of the national team's home competitive matches. During the inaugural international match at the venue in August 2010, the highest ever home attendance of the Slovenian team was achieved, as 16,135 spectators gathered for a friendly match between Slovenia and Australia.

Other venues where Slovenia played at least one home match are the Bonifika Stadium in Koper, Fazanerija City Stadium in Murska Sobota, Domžale Sports Park in Domžale, Nova Gorica Sports Park in Nova Gorica, Stanko Mlakar Stadium in Kranj, and ŽŠD Ljubljana Stadium in Ljubljana.

Rivalries
Slovenia's main football rivals are its neighbours Croatia. The matchup between the two sides is known as the Neighbourhood derby. As of March 2022, they have faced each other twelve times (eleven official matches and one unofficial match). One of the most notable matches between Slovenia and Croatia took place in 2003, where the two teams met in the qualifying playoffs for UEFA Euro 2004. After a 1–1 draw in the first match in Zagreb, Slovenia then lost 1–0 at home and failed to qualify for its third consecutive major tournament. In March 2021, Slovenia finally managed to win a game against Croatia after failing to do so in the previous nine matches, as they won 1–0 at home during the 2022 FIFA World Cup qualifiers.

Results and fixtures

The following is a list of match results in the last 12 months, as well as any future matches that have been scheduled.

2022

2023

Management

Since 1991, eight managers have been in charge of the national team. Bojan Prašnikar, Srečko Katanec and Matjaž Kek are the only three managers with more than one spell. 

Tomaž Kavčič is the manager with the shortest managerial tenure, having been in charge for only seven matches in 2018 before being sacked. He was replaced by Igor Benedejčič, who became the first manager to be appointed as a caretaker.

List of managers 
.

Players

Current squad
The following players were called up for the UEFA Euro 2024 qualifying matches against Kazakhstan and San Marino on 23 and 26 March 2023, respectively.

Caps and goals are correct as of 20 November 2022, after the match against Montenegro.

Recent call-ups
The following players have also been selected by Slovenia in the past twelve months, but are not part of the current squad.

Notes
INJ = Withdrew due to injury
WD = Player withdrew from the squad due to non-injury issue.

Previous squads

FIFA World Cup squads
2002 FIFA World Cup squad
2010 FIFA World Cup squad

UEFA European Football Championship squads
UEFA Euro 2000 squad

Records

Individual records

As of 20 November 2022, 220 players have made at least one appearance for the Slovenian national team. With 101 caps, Boštjan Cesar has the most appearances for Slovenia. Cesar also started the most matches as captain (39) and had the longest career as a Slovenian international footballer: 15 years, 1 month and 15 days. Zlatko Zahovič is the highest-scoring Slovenia player with 35 goals. Sašo Udovič scored the most goals in a single match, scoring five against Iceland in 1996.

Players in bold are still active with Slovenia.

Team records
Biggest victory: 7–0 vs. Oman, 8 February 1999
Heaviest defeat: 0–5 vs. France, 12 October 2002
Most consecutive victories: 4
From 5 June 1999 against Latvia to 4 September 1999 against Georgia
From 18 November 2009 against Russia to 13 June 2010 against Algeria
From 6 September 2020 against Moldova to 14 October 2020 against Moldova
Most consecutive matches without defeat: 9, from 3 September 2020 against Greece to 24 March 2021 against Croatia
Most consecutive defeats: 4 (achieved on five occasions, most recently in 2014)
Most consecutive matches without victory: 9, from 6 September 2018 against Bulgaria to 7 June 2019 against Austria
Most consecutive matches without scoring: 4
From 13 October 2004 against Norway to 26 March 2005 against Germany
From 5 March 2014 against Algeria to 8 September 2014 against Estonia
Most consecutive matches without conceding a goal: 6, from 3 September 2020 against Greece to 11 November 2020 against Azerbaijan

Competitive record

FIFA World Cup

UEFA European Championship

UEFA Nations League

Head-to-head record 
The following table shows Slovenia's all-time international record, correct as of 20 November 2022 after the match against Montenegro.

Honours

Minor tournaments 
 Rothmans International Tournament
 Winners: 1994
 Runners-up: 1996
 Cyprus International Tournament
 Runners-up: 1998, 2006
 Oman International Tournament
 Runners-up: 1999, 2000
 Carlsberg Cup
 Third place: 2002

Other awards 
 Best Mover of the Year: 1999

See also

Slovenia national football B team
Slovenia national under-21 football team
Slovenia national under-19 football team
Slovenia national under-17 football team
Sport in Slovenia

References

External links

 
FIFA team profile
UEFA team profile

 
European national association football teams
Football in Slovenia